Oudebildtzijl (Bildts: Ouwe-Syl) is a village in Waadhoeke municipality in the province of Friesland, the Netherlands. It had a population of around 690 in January 2017.

It is the starting point from which the Oude Bildtdijk was created. Until 2018, the village was part of the het Bildt municipality.

History 
The village was first mentioned after 1570 as niuwe zijl, and means "sluice in the old Bildt. It refers to a sluice from 1505. In 1504, a deal was struck between George, Duke of Saxony and four noblemen from Holland to polder the Middelzee. In 1505, a dike (Oude Bildtdijk) was constructed. The sluice was renewed in 1906.

In 1806, a Mennonite Church was built in Oudebildtzijl. In 1909, the church was enlarged and a clergy house with tower was added to the front. The Juliana tower is in neoclassic style with an open pavillion. The church was decommissioned in 1997, and nowadays serves as visitor centre for the nature area Aerden Plaats.

Oudebildtzijl was home to 604 people in 1840. In 1948, it became a village.

Notable people 
  (1874-1946), freak show artist, singer and acrobat, because of his height of 80 cm. Performed around the world.

Gallery

References

External links

 website about Oudebildtzijl

Waadhoeke
Populated places in Friesland